This article lists events that occurred during 1968 in Estonia.

Incumbents

Events
1st number of Estonian Soviet Encyclopedia was published.

Births
4 February – Marko Matvere, actor and singer

Deaths
2 December – Adamson-Eric, artist (b. 1902)

References

 
1960s in Estonia
Estonia
Estonia
Years of the 20th century in Estonia